Siwa is a genus of orb-weaver spiders first described by M. Grasshoff in 1970.  it contains only two species.

References

Araneidae
Araneomorphae genera